Colin James and the Little Big Band is a Jump blues album by Canadian musician Colin James, released in 1993 (see 1993 in music), featuring members of Roomful of Blues. The album had sold 220,000 units in Canada by January, 1999.

Track listing

 "Cadillac Baby" (Roy Brown) – 3:12
 "That's What You Do To Me" – 3:27
 "Sit Right Here" (Rosco Gordon) – 2:45
 "Three Hours Past Midnight" (Davis, Sam Ling) – 6:07
 "Satellite" (Burgess, Colin James) – 4:12
 "Surely (I Love You)" (James C. Bracken, Mickey Oliver) – 3:40
 "Breakin' Up The House" (Henry Glover, Mann) – 3:04
 "No More Doggin'" (Rosco Gordon, Jules Taub) – 3:09
 "Evening" (Mitchell Parish, Harry White) – 5:02
"Train Kept A-Rollin'" (Tiny Bradshaw, Howard Kay, Lois Mann) – 2:46
 "Leading Me On" (Ike Turner) – 2:18
 "The Boogie Twist Part II" (Cox, Cal Valentine) – 4:58
 "Cha Shooky Doo" (Mae Vince) – 2:12

Personnel
 Colin James  - vocals, guitars
 Johnny Ferreira - tenor saxophone
 Rich Lataille - alto saxophone
 Bob Enos - trumpet
 Chuck Leavell - organ, piano
 Reese Wynans - piano
 Norm Fisher - bass
 John "The Fly" Rossi - drums
 Doug James - baritone saxophone
 Carl Querfurth - trombone
 Roomful of Blues - horn section
 Rhode Island Boys Choir - background vocals

References

External links
 Colin James and the Little Big Band

Colin James albums
1993 albums
Albums produced by Chris Kimsey
Virgin Records albums